The Central State Museum of Kazakhstan is the largest museum in Almaty, Kazakhstan, and one of the largest museums in Central Asia.

When first established in 1931, the museum was located in the Almaty Cathedral. It moved to a modern facility in 1985 and is a landmark in Almaty.

The museum houses the most significant collection of Kazakh historical, archaeological, and modern cultural and political artifacts.

History 
In 1920, according to the decree of the Kazakh government, the Kazakh Central Regional Museum was established. At that time the collection of the Orenburg Governor's Museum was partially transferred to the educational Central Regional Museum. 

In 1929, due to the transfer of the Central Regional Museum to Almaty, the Kazakh Central Regional Museum was folded.

In the 1930s in the city of Orenburg at the Neplyuev Military School was organized "Museum of the Orenburg Territory". Later the collection of the Museum of the Orenburg region and the collection of the Zhetysuysky (Semirechensk) regional museum were included in the museum fund.

In 1931 the museum was located in the building of the former cathedral in Almaty. In 1941 the collection of the Republican antireligious museum was included in the basis of the fund.

In 1985 was built a modern building, which now houses the Central State Museum of Kazakhstan. The museum complex includes the largest restoration center in Kazakhstan, which works to restore works of art.

In 2005, the museum received the official status of a research organization, which gives an opportunity to conduct historical expeditions and expand the scope of the organization's activities. Since 2006, the museum has participated in the international event "Night of Museums".

In 2015, there was an initiative to change the museum's activities into a Cultural Center, which should include a change in the exposition. The proposal was related to the possible transition of the museum from state to municipal ownership.

Exhibition halls 

 Hall of paleontology and archeology
 Hall of historical ethnography
 History and ethnography of the people living in Kazakhstan
 Modern Kazakhstan
 Open fund
 Anthropology Museum
 Hall of Nikolai Gavrilovich Khludov

Museum building 

The museum building was built from 1978 to 1985. Before that, the museum was located in the Holy Ascension Cathedral.

It was established by order of the Almaty City Executive Committee by the organization "Glavalmaatastroy". The designer of the project was GPI "Kazgorstroyproekt". The head of the architectural team was Yu.G. Ratushny. The author of the project was Z.M. Mustafina in cooperation with B.A. Rzagaliev, B.I. Nikishina, V.I. Slusareva and others.

The rectangular in plan three-story building rests on a "stylobate" formed by the natural terrain. Volumetric and spatial characteristics of the building is based on the use of stylistic techniques of the Kazakh architecture. The frame of the building is designed on a frame system of eight external supports, pylons. The facades are designed in a single rhythmic system of pilasters which unite the three stories. The compositional center of the building is a two-story lobby, flanked by the exhibition halls. Colored metal, marble, parquet, shell rock and granite are used in the interior of the museum.

See also
 List of museums in Kazakhstan
 National Museum of the Republic of Kazakhstan

References

External links

 Museum website maintained by UNESCO
  

1931 establishments in the Kazakh Autonomous Socialist Soviet Republic
Museums established in 1931
Museums in Almaty

History museums

Archaeological museums
Buildings and structures in Almaty
Kazakhstani culture